Musical Story is a 1940 Soviet musical comedy film directed by Aleksandr Ivanovsky and Gerbert Rappaport.

Plot 
The film tells about the taxi driver Petya Govorkov, who rehearses Lensky's role in the local opera house. His talents are highly appreciated by the elderly singer and conductor Makedonsky, but because Petya leaves to study at the conservatoire, he quarrels with his girlfriend. On his opening night she hears him singing on the radio, and they are reconciled.

Starring 
 Sergei Lemeshev as Petya Govorkov
 Zoya Fyodorova as Klava Belkina
 Nikolai Konovalov as Maestro Makedonsky (as N. Konovalov)
 Erast Garin as Cabbie Tarahkanov
 Anatoly Korolkevich as Pankov (Cabbie singing 'Onegin')
 Anna Sergeyeva as Natenka (Cabbie singing 'Olga')
 Leontina Dyomina as Nanny (uncredited)

References

External links 

1940 films
1940s Russian-language films
Soviet black-and-white films
Soviet musical comedy films
1940 musical comedy films